Charlton Rauch House is a historic home located at Lexington, Lexington County, South Carolina. It was built in 1886, and is a -story, frame vernacular  Queen Anne style house with an irregular plan and a gable roof. It is sheathed in weatherboard and has a one-story rear wing. the front façade features a one-story, hip roofed porch with a second-story, shed-roofed porch; a two-story polygonal bay; and a hip-roofed, three-story, projecting polygonal bay. Its owner Charlton Rauch operated a livery stable and was a cotton buyer and dealer in general merchandise.

It was listed on the National Register of Historic Places in 1983.

References

Houses on the National Register of Historic Places in South Carolina
Queen Anne architecture in South Carolina
Houses completed in 1886
Houses in Lexington County, South Carolina
National Register of Historic Places in Lexington County, South Carolina